George Richard Eastham (13 August 1914 – January 2000) was an English footballer and manager. As an inside forward, he represented England once at international level, and played for Bolton Wanderers, Brentford, Blackpool, Swansea Town, Rochdale and Lincoln City. He is the father of George Eastham Jr. and the brother of Harry Eastham.

References

1914 births
2000 deaths
English footballers
England international footballers
Bolton Wanderers F.C. players
Brentford F.C. players
Blackpool F.C. players
Swansea City A.F.C. players
Rochdale A.F.C. players
Lincoln City F.C. players
Hyde United F.C. players
Winsford United F.C. players
Ards F.C. players
English football managers
Ards F.C. managers
Accrington Stanley F.C. (1891) managers
Glentoran F.C. managers
Sportspeople from Blackpool
Lisburn Distillery F.C. managers
English Football League players
English Football League representative players
English Football League managers
Birmingham City F.C. wartime guest players
Bolton Wanderers F.C. wartime guest players
Brentford F.C. wartime guest players
York City F.C. wartime guest players
Mansfield Town F.C. wartime guest players
Millwall F.C. wartime guest players
Queens Park Rangers F.C. wartime guest players
Association football inside forwards